Volovets is an urban-type settlement in Mukachevo Raion of Zakarpattia Oblast (region) in western Ukraine. Volovets was the administrative center of Volovets Raion (district) until 2020, housing the district's local administration buildings. The town's population was 5,178 as of the 2001 Ukrainian Census. Current population: .

Names

Sites
From the 1850s, when Volovets was part of Austria-Hungary, the town had a ski ramp. The ramp was used by Emperor Franz Joseph I when he and his family came to visit in 1862.

Sister cities
  Bad Endorf, Germany (2001)

Tourism 
Volovets is the main transport location through which passenger trains and tourists to Transcarpathia from almost all over Ukraine go. Volovets district is part of the ethnographic district of Boykivshchyna, which is one of the four well-known historical and ethnographic groups of the Ukrainian Carpathians - Hutsuls, Boykos, Lemkos and Dolynians. Volovets district offers guests both calm and active recreation. Special mention should be made of the recreational area of the village of Zhdeniievo, with its numerous camp sites and hotels that provide services for different groups of tourists.

Here you can go paragliding (Borzhava mountain meadow), ride ATVs, mountain bikes, and in winter enjoy skiing and snowboarding.

People from Volovets 
 Vasyl Betsa (born 1996), Ukrainian footballer

References

Urban-type settlements in Mukachevo Raion
Populated places established in the 1430s
Ski areas and resorts in Ukraine